General Sir Charles Thomas van Straubenzee  (17 February 1812 – 10 August 1892), was a British Army officer. He served as Commander of British Troops in China and Hong Kong, and Governor of Malta.

Military career 

Van Straubenzee was born at Fort Ricasoli, Malta, in 1812, as the second son of Thomas van Straubenzee (1782–1843), a Royal Artillery major, of Spennithorne, Yorkshire, and his wife Maria, youngest daughter of Major Henry Bowen.

A member of an old and distinguished military family, Van Straubenzee was commissioned into the Ceylon Rifle Regiment in 1828. He transferred to the 39th Regiment of Foot in 1833, and, during the Gwalior campaign, he took part in the Battle of Maharajpore in 1843; he took temporary command of his regiment when its commanding officer was wounded and brought the regiment out of action.

In 1846, he transferred to 3rd Battalion the Buffs of which he became commanding officer in 1851, and fought in the Crimean War commanding the 1st Brigade of the Light Division, and taking part in both assaults on the Redan during the Siege of Sevastopol.

In 1857, Van Straubenzee became Commander British Forces in Hong Kong and led an attack on Canton during the Second Opium War. In 1862, he was made general officer commanding a Division of the Bombay Army at Ahmedabad and subsequent took overall command of the Bombay Army.

He was colonel of the 47th Regiment of Foot from 1865 to 1867, and of the 39th Regiment of Foot from 1867, until they became part of the Dorset Regiment in 1881, after which he continued as colonel of the 2nd Battalion until 1892. Van Straubenzee became Governor of Malta in 1872.

Van Straubenzee is buried at St Mary the Virgin's Churchyard near Bath, Somerset.

Family
He married Charlotte Louisa Richardson in 1841, daughter of General John Luther Richardson.

See also
 List of British recipients of the Légion d'Honneur for the Crimean War

References

|-

|-

|-

1812 births
1892 deaths
39th Regiment of Foot officers
British Army generals
British Army personnel of the Crimean War
British Army personnel of the Second Opium War
British military personnel of the Gwalior Campaign
Buffs (Royal East Kent Regiment) officers
English people of Dutch descent
Governors and Governors-General of Malta
Knights Grand Cross of the Order of the Bath
Charles